Tommy Madden  (born April 23, 1997) is an American soccer player who plays as a midfielder.

Career
Madden attended the University of North Carolina at Charlotte where he played college soccer for four years between 2015 and 2018, making 72 appearances, scoring 7 goals and tallying 9 assists.

On January 11, 2019, Madden was drafted 38th overall in the 2019 MLS SuperDraft, by Orlando City, but was released by the club on January 26, 2019. 

Madden signed with USL Championship side New Mexico United on March 7, 2019.

Career statistics

References 

1997 births
Living people
American soccer players
Association football midfielders
Charlotte 49ers men's soccer players
New Mexico United players
Orlando City SC draft picks
People from Burtonsville, Maryland
Soccer players from Maryland
Sportspeople from Montgomery County, Maryland
USL Championship players